Igreja de Nossa Senhora do Pópulo is a church in Caldas da Rainha, Portugal. It is classified as a National Monument.

Buildings and structures in Caldas da Rainha
Churches in Leiria District
National monuments in Leiria District